Cathedral High School (CHS) is a private, Roman Catholic, high school for boys in El Paso, Texas, United States. It was established in 1925 and is part of the Roman Catholic Diocese of El Paso.

Notable alumni 
 David Campos Guaderrama, judge
 Sal Olivas, football player
 Rolando Pablos. executive, attorney, and politician

References

External links 
 

High schools in El Paso, Texas
Catholic secondary schools in Texas
Lasallian schools in the United States
Boys' schools in Texas
Educational institutions established in 1925
1925 establishments in Texas